"Close Enough to Perfect" is a song written by Carl Chambers, and recorded by American country music band Alabama.  It was released in August 1982, as the third single from Alabama's album Mountain Music.

A pop-styled ballad, "Close Enough to Perfect" was Alabama's eighth No. 1 song in the fall of 1982.

Song Backstory

According to Chambers, the title came about during a day of installing strips of wood on the Bellamy Brothers bus. “I’d pick one and she (his then-wife Nancy) would find something wrong with it.” This would happen several times until he, exhausted with frustration, would look at her and say “It’s close enough to perfect for me!” He then stopped what he was doing to go write that down because he “thought it would make a good title for a song someday”.

The rest of the song.

During this time, he was on the road with the Bellamy Brothers. One afternoon in Indiana, he was in his hotel room where he would pick up his guitar and wind up writing the song out of frustration over the way his new wife (Nancy) was being treated back home.

Charts

References

Works cited
Morris, Edward, "Alabama," Contemporary Books Inc., Chicago, 1985
Roland, Tom, "The Billboard Book of Number One Country Hits" (Billboard Books, Watson-Guptill Publications, New York, 1991

External links
Carl Chambers

1982 singles
1982 songs
Alabama (American band) songs
Song recordings produced by Harold Shedd
RCA Records singles